Dundee is a township municipality in Le Haut-Saint-Laurent Regional County Municipality in the Montérégie administrative region of Quebec, Canada. At the Canada 2021 Census, the population was 386. It is primarily an agricultural area consisting of dairy and grain farms.

Geography
Dundee is located in the southwestern corner of the Montérégie region of Quebec. The township is bordered on the south by the Canada–United States border, on the north-west by the Saint Lawrence River, and the Mohawk reserve of Akwesasne to the west. The Salmon River runs through the municipality in a northwesterly direction from the US border to the Saint Lawrence, where many islands also make up Dundee's total area.

Communities
The following locations reside within the municipality's boundaries:
Dundee Centre – a hamlet in the centre of the township
L'Île-Saint-Régis – a hamlet located on an island of the same name in the Saint Lawrence River
Pointe-Fraser – a vacation cottage community on the Saint Lawrence River
Pointe-Leblanc – a vacation cottage community on the Saint Lawrence River
Sainte-Agnès-de-Dundee – a village in the southern area of the township

Lakes and rivers
The following waterways pass through or are situated within the municipality's boundaries:
Rivière aux Saumons – runs from the US border to the Saint Lawrence River in the municipality's western area.

Demographics 

See also
 List of township municipalities in Quebec

References

External links

Township municipalities in Quebec
Incorporated places in Le Haut-Saint-Laurent Regional County Municipality
Quebec populated places on the Saint Lawrence River